Elias Sukkar is a Lebanon international rugby league footballer who plays as a  for the Auburn Warriors. He was selected to represent Lebanon in the 2017 Rugby League World Cup.

Representative career

References

External links
2017 RLWC profile

1991 births
Living people
Auburn Warriors players
Australian people of Lebanese descent
Australian rugby league players
Lebanon national rugby league team players
Rugby league props